Édouard Charles Philippe (born 28 November 1970) is a French politician serving as Mayor of Le Havre since 2020, previously holding the office from 2010 to 2017. He was Prime Minister of France from 15 May 2017 to 3 July 2020 under President Emmanuel Macron.

A lawyer by occupation, Philippe is a former member of the Union for a Popular Movement (UMP), which later became The Republicans (LR). He served as a member of the National Assembly from 2012 to 2017, representing the seventh constituency of Seine-Maritime. After being elected to the presidency on 7 May 2017, Macron appointed him Prime Minister of France. Philippe subsequently named his government on 17 May. He was succeeded by Jean Castex before his reelection to the mayorship in Le Havre.

Early life and education 
Édouard Philippe, the son of French teachers, was born in Rouen in 1970 and grew up in a left-wing household. He has one sibling, a sister. He comes from a family of dockworkers, a profession in which members of his family are still employed. He grew up in a suburban neighbourhood in Rouen. He was at first a pupil at the Michelet School in Rouen before moving to Grand-Quevilly where he attended Jean-Texier College and later attending Lycée les Bruyères in Sotteville-lès-Rouen.

He obtained his baccalauréat at the École de Gaulle-Adenauer in Bonn, and after a year in hypokhâgne, he studied at Sciences Po for three years and graduated in 1992, and later studied at the École nationale d'administration (ÉNA) from 1995 to 1997 (the "Marc Bloch cohort").

Philippe served as an artillery officer during his national service in 1994. He continued to serve in the operational reserve for several years afterwards.

In his years at Sciences Po, he supported Michel Rocard and was influenced by him, identifying with the Rocardian and social democratic wings of the Socialist Party. His brief flirtation with the Socialists ended after Rocard was toppled from the leadership of the Socialist Party. After leaving the ÉNA in 1997, he went on to work at the Council of State, specialising in public procurement law.

Political career 
In 2001, Philippe joined Antoine Rufenacht as Deputy Mayor of Le Havre charged with legal affairs; Rufenacht served as mayor of Le Havre from 1995 to 2010 and campaign director for Jacques Chirac in the 2002 presidential election. Recognising the ideological proximity between Michel Rocard and Alain Juppé, Philippe supported the latter at the time of the creation of the Union for a Popular Movement (UMP) in 2002, marking the end of his left-wing activism; the same year, he failed to win his constituency in the legislative elections. He served under Juppé as director general of services of the UMP until 2004, when the mayor of Bordeaux was convicted as a result of the fictitious jobs case implicating the Rally for the Republic (RPR). He then took a job in the private sector, working with the American law firm Debevoise & Plimpton LLP, and was elected to the regional council of Upper Normandy the same year.

In the wake of Nicolas Sarkozy's victory in the 2007 presidential election, Philippe briefly returned to political life working for Alain Juppé, when Juppé served briefly as Minister of Ecology, Sustainable Development and Energy, before being appointed Director of Public Affairs at Areva, where he worked from 2007 to 2010. He was also substitute to Jean-Yves Besselat, who served as the member of the National Assembly for Seine-Maritime's 7th constituency from 2007 to 2012. In 2008, he was elected to the general council of Seine-Maritime in the canton of Le Havre-5, and in 2010 was elected mayor of Le Havre after the resignation of Rufenacht, his mentor, and also became President of the Agglomeration community of Le Havre the same year. After Besselat's death in 2012 following a long illness, Philippe took his seat, successfully holding it in the subsequent legislative elections. He was reelected as Mayor of Le Havre in the 2014 municipal elections in the first round, with an absolute majority of 52.04% of expressed votes. Following his resignation on 20 May 2017 as Le Havre Mayor, he retained a seat in the municipal council.

2017 presidential election 
He worked for the campaign of Alain Juppé in the primary of the right and centre in 2016, serving as a spokesperson alongside Benoist Apparu. Though Philippe and Apparu, as well as Christophe Béchu, later joined the campaign of François Fillon for the 2017 presidential election after his victory in the primary, the three parliamentarians – close to Juppé – quit on 2 March 2017 after the candidate was summoned to appear before judges amidst the Fillon affair. He said he would not  seek to retain his seat in the legislative elections in June to avoid breaching the law limiting the accumulation of mandates. Following the victory of Emmanuel Macron in the presidential election, there was speculation that Philippe was a potential choice for Prime Minister, representing three essential aspects: political renewal (at the age of only 46), affiliation with the centre-right, and familiarity with the political terrain.

Prime Minister 

On 15 May 2017, Philippe was appointed as Prime Minister by Emmanuel Macron after speculation he was a contender for the office alongside former Ecology Minister Jean-Louis Borloo, MoDem Leader François Bayrou and IMF Managing Director Christine Lagarde.

In the June 2017 legislative elections, Macron's party, renamed "La République En Marche!", together with its ally the Democratic Movement (MoDem), secured a comfortable majority, winning 350 seats out of 577, with his party alone winning an outright majority of 308 seats. Philippe is a member of The Republicans though he campaigned for La République En Marche! due to the party supporting his role as Prime Minister. He formed the Second Philippe government on 21 May 2017 following a series of resignations after scandal embroiled Ministers François Bayrou, Sylvie Goulard, Marielle de Sarnez and Richard Ferrand. This diminished Democratic Movement's representation in the government significantly.

Philippe secured a vote of confidence and was allowed to govern with a majority government on 4 July 2017. He was confirmed with a vote of 370 against 67. Following the vote, Philippe addressed the parliament, talking about plans to tackle France's debt by raising cigarette tax and cutting spending. Philippe also talked about plans to reduce corporate tax from 33.3% to 25% by 2022. Philippe announced the government's labour reform plan which will give companies more power when it comes to negotiating conditions directly with their employees. Labour reform was one of Macron's biggest election promises and has been seen as the government's biggest economic reform.

On 12 July 2017, Philippe announced a new immigration plan. The plan attempts to speed up asylum claims from fourteen months to six, provide housing for 7,500 refugees by the end of 2019, improve living conditions for minors and deport economic migrants. The draft of the law will be introduced in September.

On 3 July 2020, Philippe resigned as Prime Minister. He ran successfully in the 2020 Le Havre mayoral election.

In October 2020, Philippe was one of several current and former government officials whose home was searched by French authorities following complaints about the government's handling of the COVID-19 pandemic in France.

Ahead of the 2022 presidential election, Philippe endorsed Macron for reelection.

Personal life 
Philippe is married to Édith Chabre, the executive director of the School of Law at Sciences Po. They have three children.

Since the middle of the 2010s, Philippe has sported a short beard. He is the first Prime Minister with facial hair since Henri Queuille (Prime Minister in 1951) and the first one with a full beard since Alexandre Ribot (Prime Minister last in 1917). Further, he is one of a few Prime Ministers in the last century (Henri Queuille, Raymond Barre, Francois Fillon, Jean-Marc Ayrault) to be older than the president he served under, by an unprecedented seven years.

As Prime Minister, he announced that he had vitiligo, a skin disease responsible for the noticeable white patch of hair on his beard.

Honours

Foreign honours

Published works 

Philippe has co-authored two works of fiction:
 
  This political thriller recounts a presidential election mired in tricks and betrayals, culminating with the unmasking of the to-be-appointed Prime Minister's criminal history in extremis.
 

In 2015, he prefaced Promenades avec Oscar Niemeyer by Danielle Knapp, published by Petit à Petit.

References

External links 

 Biography on the National Assembly site
 Biography on the site of Le Havre

|-

|-

|-

|-

|-

1970 births
Living people
Lycée Janson-de-Sailly alumni
Sciences Po alumni
École nationale d'administration alumni
Members of the Conseil d'État (France)
Deputies of the 14th National Assembly of the French Fifth Republic
Union for a Popular Movement politicians
The Republicans (France) politicians
Horizons politicians
Mayors of places in Normandy
Politicians from Rouen
Prime Ministers of France
French Army officers
Grand Cross of the Ordre national du Mérite
Grand Officiers of the Légion d'honneur
Honorary Officers of the Order of Australia
Departmental councillors (France)
Regional councillors of France
People associated with Debevoise & Plimpton
French political party founders
People with vitiligo